2nd Railway Corps of the People's Liberation Army was a military formation mainly focusing on railway construction missions. It was activated in November 1956 in Nanping, Fujian.

The corps was composed of 1st, 5th and 6th Railway Divisions.

The corps was intended to participate in the construction of Yingtan-Xiamen railway. However, due to the change of the construction plan, the activation of the corps was aborted. On April 6, 1957, the corps was formally deactivated.

References 

Corps of the People's Liberation Army
Military units and formations established in 1956
Military units and formations disestablished in 1957
Military railways